Sta. Lucia National High School (Filipino: Mataás na Paaraláng Pambansâ ng Santá Lucía) is a state-funded secondary education institution located in Sta. Lucia, Calumpit, Bulacan, Philippines.

History 
The school was established during the 1987–1988 school year as an annex to Dampol 2nd High School. Three years later, it was declared as an independent public high school and moved to its present location, a land given by Herminio de Guia, from the makeshift school in front of the Sta. Lucia Catholic Church. It was given a national high school status in 2012.

The present principal is Efren Santiago, in office since school year 2009–2010.

Student organisations

Supreme Student Government
The Supreme Student Government is the highest recognised student body in the school.

Annual elections are held every February for the new set of officers for the following school year except for Grade 7 officers where elections are conducted early on the school year (usually June or July).

The Lucians
The Lucians is the official newsletter in English, formerly known as the land The Land until the 2009–2010 school year. In 2011, the paper won third place for Best Editorial Page in the Regional Secondary Schools Press Conference.

Ang Pinitak
Ang Pinitak (Filipino: the manor) is the official publication in Filipino. The current adviser, Vilma Ramos, won as the adviser highest-pointer for the school year 2013–2014 in the EDDIS Secondary Schools Press Conference.
The name Pinítak, which may directly be translated as ricefields, is also a wordplay to the Filipino word piniták, or editorial.

Other School Organisations
Some of the notable intramural organisations are listed below:
 Interact Club - SLNHS Chapter
 English Club
 Samahan ng Mag-Aaral sa Filipino

Grade Levels

7 to 12

References

High schools in Bulacan